Asphalt 9: Legends is a 2018 racing video game developed by Gameloft Barcelona and published by Gameloft. Released on July 25, 2018, it's the fifteenth major game of Asphalt series. In comparison to previous entries, there are several new and improved features, such as a prestigious car lineup, new control schemes, including the autopilot mode called "TouchDrive", and race modes, and the reimplemented "shockwave nitro" from Asphalt 6: Adrenaline. The graphics are considered significantly improved compared to its 2013 predecessor, Asphalt 8: Airborne.

Gameplay 

The gameplay in Asphalt 9 is similar to the other Asphalt Games with noticeable differences in graphics and design. There were 48 cars featured in the game when soft-launched, but the worldwide release saw the introduction of four new cars, leading to 52 cars.

There are currently 195 cars as of the December 2022 update. Like its predecessor, each of the cars belongs to a class progressively featuring higher performance and rarity: D, C, B, A, and S. The player starts with a car in the lowest class (Class D), the Mitsubishi Lancer Evolution X. All cars in the game now require blueprints to unlock and later "star up", with each of them having anywhere from 3 to 6 stars. For each new star, the car's performance capability is increased. Each car can also be customized with the new car editor feature. Each car now also uses fuel when used for a race event, limiting its use for any game mode. The fuel quantity for each individual car is based on the max number of possible stars for that car: 3 star cars have 6 fuel, 4 star cars have 5, etc.

Upon unlocking a car, the player can often choose from a few official stock colors or designs. Once the car has been starred up at least once, the player can create custom paint job colors to the body, rims, and brake calipers for most models. Some models also allow for carbon parts on the hood, trunk, and wings. Several cars are also convertibles (they can be converted from closed roofs to open ones in-game), like the BMW Z4 LCI E89, the Chevrolet Corvette Grand Sport, and the McLaren 570S Spider. Introduced in the 2019 Summer Update, several cars like the Mercedes-AMG GTS may also be customized with special tires, rims, and bodywork modifications, earned through rare 'customization packs'. Also new to the series are "clubs", where up to 20 players can collaboratively score "reputation points" to acquire exclusive rewards. The more reputation points the club scores, the better rewards, ranging from credits to blueprints for cars.

The game also features "nitro shockwave", returning from Asphalt 6: Adrenaline and Asphalt 7: Heat. When the player has a full nitro bar and taps twice on the Nitro button in a quick succession, a purple pulse is released from the vehicle and represents a drastic increase in the car's acceleration. On mobile platforms, Asphalt 9 has three control schemes: Tilt to Steer, Tap to Steer, and the brand new "Touch Drive" in which the player selects routes and stunts by swiping left and right. Touch Drive is intended for beginners and casual players. On Windows 10 and Mac devices, Touch Drive and manual controls can be used with the keyboard; or with a tilt to steer, if the device has a touchscreen and an accelerometer.

In the game, there are five race modes: Career, Multiplayer, Club, Daily Events, and Seasonal Events (Grand Prix, Starway, Special Event). In career mode, the player participates in an extensive single-player campaign consisting of six chapters, each containing several series of races focusing on a certain car class or manufacturer, with more chapters set to be added. The player can gain a total of 827 blueprints for various cars from Career. In Multiplayer, the player competes against other players in real-time online multiplayer races, ranked by an Elo system. In Daily Events, the player participates in daily or weekly competitions to beat other players' times and earn other items. Such events include Car Hunts, focused on dropping blueprints for a specific car, and Time-Limited Events, usually themed to the season of the game. 

The Seasonal Events tab was initially titled "Special Events", but due to the number of events added, was rebranded to Seasonal Events. "Special Events", which were introduced with the Bugatti Chiron Special Event in December 2018, and have continued since with the introduction of "Drive Syndicate" events in July 2019, themed around escaping the police as a member of an underground 'drive syndicate'. The 2022 Winter Drive Syndicate was announced to be the last of its kind by GameLoft. Initially slated to release in the January 2023 "Lunar New Year" season, its replacement will be the Faraday Road Test, an event about which little is known so far. This event is delayed until the next season. Since the older "Godly Beasts Update", a new type of Special Event called "Grand Prix" was launched, starting with the Techrules AT96 Track Edition Grand Prix. Players compete against other players for rewards, including the Key that allows the player to immediately unlock the featured Grand Prix car, though the car itself can still be "starred up" with blueprints. 

Drive Syndicate events have been subject to criticism due to their numerous paywalls and high requirements, having the player complete a series of missions to accumulate points towards the rewards track, which goes up to approximately one million points to unlock certain cars. However, the events run on a separate "energy" system, which only allows players to play a certain amount of races, regardless of fuel. Some cars are also required to race in the event, and the player may not be given them immediately (though they can acquire the cards for them through the event shop). Upon completing all missions, and thus acquiring enough points, players will earn the event's flagship cars, usually being acquired as a key rather than a set of cards (along with other cars as well).

There are 6 race types in Asphalt 9. The "classic" race mode from previous games has returned alongside new career-exclusive races: "Time Attack" and "Hunted". Multiplayer-exclusive races are "Slipstream", "Ghost", and "Ghost Slipstream". In Time Attack, the player has to cross the finish line within a time limit, collecting time bonuses along the track. In Hunted, the player must escape a police pursuit in a car chase without wrecking or running out of time, both of which are called getting "busted" and end the race in a loss. In Ghost, players cannot collide with other players' cars - all the cars are treated as 'ghosts', making the event like a live time trial. In Slipstream and Ghost Slipstream, players can perform a slipstream by driving behind opponents, allowing them to quickly build up their nitro. Slipstreaming can only be interrupted by holding the brake button, and the difference between the two is that there are no collisions in Ghost Slipstream.

The game features a number of race tracks set in new locations: Cairo (including Giza), the Himalayas, Wyoming (named U.S. Midwest), Scotland, the Caribbean, Auckland (featuring street circuit-inspired aesthetics), Buenos Aires and Greenland. It also brings back several locations from previous games in the series: San Francisco, Rome, Shanghai, Osaka, New York, Nevada, and Paris.

Development 
The game was developed by Gameloft's Barcelona Studio which also made Asphalt 8: Airborne, and co-developed Asphalt Xtreme with Gameloft Madrid. The game uses the Bullet physics engine and the Jet Engine game engine. Continuing the tradition from Asphalt 8, the game features licensed soundtracks.

The first rumors of Asphalt 9: Legends began back in 2016, with Gameloft posting pictures on Twitter, showing Gameloft Barcelona making a map that had not been seen in Asphalt 8: Airborne. The game was scheduled to be released in the summer of 2017 according to Gameloft's press release, and the name was going to be Asphalt 9: Shockwave. In February 2018, Gameloft was doing a live Q&A with one of their community managers at Gameloft London, where he responded to questions about Asphalt 9, and said that he was not allowed to comment on the future of the Asphalt series. Four days later, however, a trailer was revealed for Asphalt 9. On April 1, 2016, Gameloft posted an April Fools joke trailer on their Facebook page that the game was going to be called Asphalt 9: Foolspeed, a game that revealed outdated footage of Asphalt 4: Elite Racing.

The game was first released for iOS as a soft launch on February 26, 2018, in the Philippines, then in Thailand on March 22, 2018. It was later released for Android as a soft launch, on May 17, 2018, in the Philippines.  Pre-registration for the worldwide launch began on June 29, 2018. Around the same time, people could pre-register the game on the Google Play Store. On July 24, 2018, Gameloft announced the game's release date, July 26, 2018, on a Facebook and YouTube Livestream. However, the game was released a day earlier than planned. When the game was released worldwide, it reached 4 million downloads across all platforms in less than a week.

On June 6, 2019, Gameloft announced that the game would be available on Nintendo Switch. The port was released on October 8, 2019. There is a mode where players can play offline with friends and family with different controllers but it needs to have to earn a certain amount of career flags to unlock Offline Mode. There are Joy-Con controls and Touchscreen controls when using the Switch in Handheld Mode, allowing use of either the screen itself (akin to mobile devices) or use of the controllers.

An Xbox One and Series X/S port was announced in April 2021 and it was released on August 31, 2021. An arcade adaptation, developed by IGS and Wahlap Technology under a license from Gameloft, was released worldwide in 2021 under the name Asphalt 9 Legends: Arcade DX.

A Steam port was announced in July 2022 and was released in August 2, 2022

Reception 

Asphalt 9 received positive reviews upon release, with the new graphics and visual design being almost unanimously praised as a major improvement over the series' predecessors, but there were mixed responses to the progression system, including its hostile monetization and “energy” systems.

Prasad of GSMArena.com wrote: "Visually, Asphalt 9 is stunning and quite possibly the best-looking game on the mobile platform today", while TechCommuters' review stated, "Regardless of the platform you're playing on, the game delivers...With a wide variety of cars, accessories, tracks, and events, you can play this game for a long time without any dull moment." Nick Tylwalk of Gamezebo also praised the graphics, but wrote that the "blueprint system can be a mixed bag and there are times when you feel stuck, progression-wise." Vishal Mathur of News18 mentioned "every time you run a wheel off the road, the dust that gets thrown up is finely detailed. The cars look very realistic too... However, it isn't exactly easy to get exotic cars. As with most racing games, you start from the bottom of the pyramid and then work your way up. In many races, the rewards that you get are blueprints of vehicles. You will need to collect the required number of blueprints for the car that you are eyeing before you can unlock it. This is slightly difficult, and we feel that element has been added to ensure that players remain active for longer on the game, in the pursuit of their favorite car."

The game won the award for "Sports Game" at the 2019 Webby Awards.

Asphalt 9 had also won the 2019 Apple Design Awards, and is the only racing game to win the Design Award.

Notes

References

External links 

2018 video games
Android (operating system) games
Apple Design Awards recipients
Arcade games
Asphalt (series)
Gameloft games
IOS games
IPadOS software
Nintendo Switch games
Racing video games
Video games about police officers
Video games developed in Spain
Video games set in Argentina
Video games set in the Caribbean
Video games set in Egypt
Video games set in Greenland
Video games set in Nepal
Video games set in New York City
Video games set in New Zealand
Video games set in Nevada
Video games set in Osaka
Video games set in Paris
Video games set in Rome
Video games set in San Francisco
Video games set in Scotland
Video games set in Shanghai
Video games set in Wyoming
Windows games
Xbox One games
Xbox One X enhanced games
Xbox Series X and Series S games